Lisa Andreas (born Lisa Large; 22 December 1987) is an English singer. She represented Cyprus in the Eurovision Song Contest 2004 and came fifth with her performance of "Stronger Every Minute". At the age of 16, Andreas was the youngest singer to take part in the competition that year.

2001–2003
Andreas began performing as a solo artist at the age of 13, and won a competition at the Strand in Gillingham. Singing became more important to her and she went on to perform at various concerts and road-shows, giving her talents to support charities such as Children with leukaemia. She performed in a concert at the Red Cube in London to raise funds for the New York disaster fund for the 11 September 2001 attacks. Andreas has also performed at Pride concerts including Leicester Pride, Manchester Europride and, with an audience of more than 25,000, at the Cardiff Mardi Gras. She has also worked with the Kent Police by performing to her peers at Snap shows in Kentish schools.

Andreas's Cypriot heritage came to the fore in 2004, when at age 15 on 12 December 2003 she won the right to represent Cyprus in the Eurovision Song Contest 2004. Andreas was the youngest artist taking part in the competition, and came fifth with the song "Stronger Every Minute" an emotional power-ballad, a placing that gave Cyprus the right to participate in the finals for the 50th Eurovision Song Contest 2005, without having to take part in the semi-final.

2004–present
In December 2004, Andreas split from her previous management. She is currently writing and co-producing her own songs.

Andreas appeared at the Eurovision night Stockholm Pride festival in summer 2004. She danced at Her Majesty's Theatre in London in March 2005. On 22 February 2006, she was back in Cyprus, performing in the Cyprus finals of Eurovision 2006 for special celebrations commemorating the 25 years which Cyprus takes part in the Eurovision competition.

She participated in the fourth series of British TV's The X Factor where she made it through to the second round.

Personal life
Andreas was born in England to a British father and a Greek Cypriot mother but christened in Cyprus. She lived in Nicosia for two and a half years as an infant, but returned to the United Kingdom after her grandfather had health problems, spending most of her childhood in Gillingham, Kent.

She was a pupil at Chatham Grammar School for Girls in Kent, which granted her two weeks off school for the song contest. On her return she passed all ten of her GCSEs.

References

1987 births
Living people
English people of Greek Cypriot descent
Eurovision Song Contest entrants for Cyprus
Eurovision Song Contest entrants of 2004
21st-century English women singers
21st-century English singers